Saneiwork Sumiyoshi Sports Center is an arena in Sumiyoshi-ku, Osaka, Japan. It is the former home arena of the Osaka Evessa of the B.League, Japan's professional basketball league.

Facilities
 No.1 Gymnasium 1850 m2 50.9m×36.3m
 No.2 Gymnasium 670 m2 35.1m×19.0m
 Indoor swimming pool 25m×8 courses

References

Basketball venues in Japan
Indoor arenas in Japan
Osaka Evessa
Sports venues in Osaka
Sports venues completed in 2000
2000 establishments in Japan